The 1979 Trenton Twin Indy were the fifth and sixth rounds of the 1979 IndyCar season, held on June 10, at Trenton Speedway, Hamilton Township, Mercer County, near Trenton, New Jersey

Race 1

Summary 
Gordon Johncock won the pole for the race, with Bobby Unser starting second, Al Unser starting third, Tom Sneva starting fourth, and Johnny Rutherford starting fifth. 

In the race, Johncock held the lead for the first 44 laps, before Bobby Unser took the lead on lap 45 after Johncock entered the pits. Johncock fell further to third after he spun out on lap 49.  Al Unser moved up to second, and was two seconds behind Bobby Unser when a caution came out on lap 57, but when the green flag flew again Bobby Unser won over his brother. Johncock finished third, Wally Dallenbach finished fourth, and Rick Mears finished fifth.

Results

Lap Leader Breakdown

Race 2

Summary 
Starting positions for the race were determined by finishes in the first race, putting Bobby Unser on the pole. In the race itself, Unser briefly lost the lead to Gordon Johncock on the first lap,  but he took it back and except for 5 laps led by Pancho Carter controlled the rest of the race. Wally Dallenbach finished second, Johnny Rutherford in third, Tom Bagley in fourth, and Gordon Johncock in fifth.

Results

Lap leader breakdown

Points standings after the Race
Note: Only top 10 are listed

References

External links
 Full Weekend Times & Results

1979 in CART
June 1979 sports events in the United States